Carlton Wing is an American politician, businessman, and former sports broadcaster serving as a member of the Arkansas House of Representatives from the 38th district. Elected in November 2016, he assumed office in January 2017.

Education 
Wing earned a Bachelor of Arts degree in broadcast communications from Brigham Young University and a Master of Business Administration from Harding University.

Career 
Wing began his career as a producer and sideline reporter for Blue and White Sports Network, now a part of BYU TV. In 1992 and 1993, he worked as a sales representative for Dentrix. Wing worked as the sports director of KJZZ-TV in Salt Lake City from 1993 to 1995, KREM in Spokane, Washington from 1995 to 1998, and KARK-TV in Little Rock, Arkansas from 1998 to 2001. From 2001 to 2009, Wing was the host of Fishing League Worldwide's annual tournament. In 2008, he founded Wing Media Group. Wing was elected to the Arkansas House of Representatives in November 2016 and assumed office in January 2017. He also serves as chair of the House Management Committee.

References 

Living people
Brigham Young University alumni
Harding University alumni
People from North Little Rock, Arkansas
American sports announcers
Republican Party members of the Arkansas House of Representatives
21st-century American politicians
Year of birth missing (living people)